"I Want You Back" is the first national single by the Jackson 5. It was released by Motown on October 6, 1969, and became the first number-one hit for the band on January 31, 1970. It was performed on the band's first television appearances, on October 18, 1969, on Diana Ross's The Hollywood Palace and on their milestone performance on December 14, 1969, on The Ed Sullivan Show.

The song, along with a B-side remake of "Who's Lovin' You" by Smokey Robinson & the Miracles, was the only single to be released from the Jackson 5's first album, Diana Ross Presents The Jackson 5. It went to number one on the Soul singles chart for four weeks and held the number-one position on the Billboard Hot 100 singles chart for the week ending January 31, 1970.

"I Want You Back" was ranked 104 on Rolling Stones 500 Greatest Songs of All Time.

Production
Originally considered for Gladys Knight & the Pips and later for Diana Ross, as "I Wanna Be Free", "I Want You Back" explores the theme of a lover who decides that he was too hasty in dropping his partner. An unusual aspect about "I Want You Back" was that its main lead vocal was performed by a tween, Michael Jackson.

"I Want You Back" was released on October 6, 1969, and was the first Jackson 5 single to be released by Motown and the first song written and produced by The Corporation, a team comprising Motown chief Berry Gordy, Freddie Perren, Alphonso Mizell, and Deke Richards. It also is the first of four Jackson 5 number-ones released in a row (the others being "ABC" – 1970, "The Love You Save" – 1970, and "I'll Be There" – 1970) and the first Jackson 5 song recorded in Los Angeles, California; the quintet had previously been recording Bobby Taylor-produced remakes of other artists' hits, including "Who's Lovin' You", the B-side to "I Want You Back", at Hitsville U.S.A. in Detroit, Michigan. From late 1969 and on, nearly all of the Jackson 5's recordings were done in Los Angeles when the majority of recordings for other artists on the label were done in Detroit.

Although Gladys Knight had been the first to mention the Jacksons to Berry Gordy, and Bobby Taylor brought the Jackson brothers to Motown, Motown credited Diana Ross with discovering them. This was done not only to help promote the Jackson 5, but also to help ease Ross' transition into a solo career, which she began in 1970 soon after the Jackson 5 became a success.

The song was remixed for the 2009 release The Remix Suite.

Live performances
The Jackson 5 performed "I Want You Back" during all of their world tours, either as a full song or as a part of the Jackson 5 Medley in concerts (which also included "ABC" and "Mama's Pearl", later on switched with "The Love You Save" in 1973). During their second-ever television appearance (in an episode of The Hollywood Palace hosted by Diana Ross & the Supremes), the Jackson 5 performed "I Want You Back" along with Sly & the Family Stone's "Sing a Simple Song", The Delfonics' "Can You Remember", and James Brown's "There Was a Time". They also performed the song on American Bandstand and The Andy Williams Show.

Michael Jackson performed the song as part of the "Jackson 5 Medley" (which also included the songs "The Love You Save" and "I'll Be There") during all of his world tours - the Bad World Tour, the Dangerous World Tour and the HIStory World Tour.  The song was performed live at the Michael Jackson: 30th Anniversary Special in 2001, in which Jackson reunited with his brothers on stage for the first time since 1984. The song was to be performed at Jackson's This Is It comeback concerts in London, which were cancelled due to his death.

Reception and legacy
The song has sold six million copies worldwide. In 1999, "I Want You Back" was also inducted into the Grammy Hall of Fame.

"I Want You Back" ranks number 104 on Rolling Stones list of the '500 Greatest Songs of All Time'. It also ranks ninth on Rolling Stone's list of the '100 Greatest Pop Songs since 1963'. In 2020, it was ranked number 2 on Rolling Stone's list of 'The 100 Greatest Debut Singles of All Time'.

In 2006, Pitchfork named it the second best song of the 1960s, adding that the chorus contains "possibly the best chord progression in pop music history". A June 2009 article by The Daily Telegraph called it "arguably the greatest pop record of all time". Digital Spy called the song "one of the most enduring pop singles of the sixties".

According to Acclaimed Music, it is the 45th most celebrated song in popular music history, and the 2nd best song of 1969.

The single has been awarded 2× Platinum certification in 2021, by the British Phonographic Industry Association.

"I Want You Back" has long been considered one of the most sampled songs in all of hip hop music. The song has been sampled over 60 times since its release by artists including Jay-Z and The Notorious B.I.G.

The song was included in the soundtrack for the 2014 film Guardians of the Galaxy.

Personnel
Credits are adapted from Michael Jackson All The Songs and AllMusic.

 Michael Jackson – lead vocals
 Tito Jackson – vocals, backing vocals
 Jackie Jackson – vocals, backing vocals
 Jermaine Jackson – vocals, backing vocals
 Marlon Jackson – vocals, backing vocals
 Keith Washington – backing vocals
 Ludie Washington – backing vocals
 Fonce Mizell – piano
 Freddie Perren – piano
 Louis Shelton – guitar
 David T. Walker – rhythm guitar
 Wilton Felder – bass guitar
 Don Peake – guitar
 Gene Pello – drums
 Clarence McDonald – keyboards
 Joe Sample – piano
 Sandra Crouch – tambourine 
 Unknown musician – bongos 

Charts

Weekly charts

Year-end charts

Certifications

Cleopatra version

English girl group Cleopatra recorded a cover version of "I Want You Back" for their 1998 debut studio album, Comin' Atcha!. It was released as the album's third single on August 10, 1998, and received mixed reviews from music critics. "I Want You Back" became the group's third and final top-five hit on the UK Singles Chart, peaking at number four and staying on the chart for 11 weeks, making it their longest-charting single along with "Cleopatra's Theme". It also charted in several other countries, reaching the top 20 in France and New Zealand.

Critical reception
British trade paper Music Week reviewed the song before its release, calling it "close-to-the-original" and giving it a "side-thumb" rating. British columnist James Masterton wrote that this cover version has "no merit whatsoever" but ultimately called the track "forgivable" due to Cleopatra's talents and worldwide popularity, referring to the single as "nothing short of a superb but faithful rendition of an all time classic song by a group with the voices to carry it off perfectly".

Track listingsUK CD1 "I Want You Back" – 4:02
 "I Want You Back" (Darkchild remix) – 4:06
 "I Want You Back" (Stepchild remix) – 4:52UK CD2 "I Want You Back" – 4:02
 "I Want You Back" (Direktorz of the Mix R+B remix) – 3:55
 "I Want You Back" (Ordinary People club mix) – 4:40UK 12-inch singleA1. "I Want You Back" (Darkchild remix) – 4:02
A2. "I Want You Back" (Stepchild remix) – 4:52
B1. "I Want You Back" (Direktorz of the Mix R+B remix) – 3:55
B2. "I Want You Back" (Ordinary People club mix) – 4:40UK cassette single and European CD single "I Want You Back" – 4:02
 "I Want You Back" (Darkchild remix) – 4:06Australian CD single "I Want You Back"
 "I Want You Back" (Darkchild remix)
 "I Want You Back" (Stepchild remix)
 "I Want You Back" (Direktorz of the Mix R+B remix)
 "I Want You Back" (Ordinary People club mix)

Credits and personnel
Credits are taken from the UK CD1 liner notes.Studios Recorded at Cookhouse Recording Studios (Minneapolis, Minnesota), The Loft Studios (Los Angeles), RAK Studios (London, England), and Plus XXX Studios (Paris, France)Personnel'

 Freddie Perren – writing
 Alphonso Mizell – writing
 Berry Gordy – writing
 Deke Richards – writing
 Cleopatra Higgins – lead vocals
 Zainam Higgins – backing vocals
 Yonah Higgins – backing vocals
 Christina Higgins – additional backing vocals
 Tiara Le Macks – additional backing vocals
 'Lil Roger Troutman Jr. – talk box
 David Barry – guitar
 Shaun LaBelle – keyboards, synthesizers, drum programming, strings, production
 Dik Shopteau – recording (Cookhouse)
 Brad Haehnel – recording (The Loft)
 Graeme Stewart – recording (RAK)
 Marcellus Fernandes – recording (Plus XXX), mixing

Charts

Twice version

A cover of "I Want You Back" by South Korean girl group Twice was released by Warner Music Japan on June 15, 2018, as a digital single.

Charts

Certifications

References

External links
 Overview of "I Want You Back", featuring picture sleeves from all over the world 
 List of cover versions of "I Want You Back" at SecondHandSongs.com
 

The Jackson 5 songs
1969 singles
1969 songs
1998 singles
2018 singles
Billboard Hot 100 number-one singles
Cashbox number-one singles
Grammy Hall of Fame Award recipients
Graham Parker songs
Motown singles
Songs written by Berry Gordy
Songs written by Deke Richards
Songs written by Freddie Perren
Tito Nieves songs
Twice (group) songs
Victoria Justice songs
Victorious
Warner Music Japan singles